Cleavage stimulatory factor or cleavage stimulation factor (CstF or CStF) is a heterotrimeric protein, made up of the proteins CSTF1 (55kDa), CSTF2 (64kDa) and CSTF3 (77kDa), totalling about 200 kDa. It is involved in the cleavage of the 3' signaling region from a newly synthesized pre-messenger RNA (mRNA) molecule. CstF is recruited by cleavage and polyadenylation specificity factor (CPSF) and assembles into a protein complex on the 3' end to promote the synthesis of a functional polyadenine tail, which results in a mature mRNA molecule ready to be exported from the cell nucleus to the cytosol for translation.

The amount of CstF in a cell is dependent on the phase of the cell cycle, increasing significantly during the transition from G0 phase to S phase in mouse fibroblast and human splenic B cells.

Genes
 CSTF1, CSTF2 or CSTF2T, CSTF3

References

Further reading
 Lodish H, Berk A, Matsudaira P, Kaiser CA, Krieger M, Scott MP, Zipursky SL, Darnell J. (2004). Molecular Cell Biology. WH Freeman: New York, NY. 5th ed.

External links
 

Protein complexes
Gene expression
RNA-binding proteins